The 2022–23 season was the 57th season of NEROCA FC in existence and sixth season in the I-League

Players

Pre-season and friendlies

I-League

League table

References 

2022–23 I-League by team
NEROCA FC seasons